Paul Manuel Cominges Mayorca (born 24 July 1975) is a Peruvian retired footballer who played as a striker. His last season as a footballer was in the 2010 Descentralizado season with José Gálvez FBC. He is nicknamed 'Papacito' ('Little Daddy') and is the older brother of midfielder Juan Cominges.

Club career
Cominges previously played for Coronel Bolognesi, where his nine goals helped guide the club to the Clausura 2007 title. He also played for PAOK and OFI Crete in the Greek Super League.

International career
Cominges has made seven appearances for the Peru national football team, including playing at the Copa América 1997.

Honours

Club 
Alianza Lima
 Clausura: 1999

Coronel Bolognesi
 Clausura: 2007

References

External links

1979 births
Living people
Footballers from Lima
Peruvian footballers
Peru international footballers
Club Universitario de Deportes footballers
Cienciano footballers
FBC Melgar footballers
PAOK FC players
OFI Crete F.C. players
Club Alianza Lima footballers
Estudiantes de Medicina footballers
Panachaiki F.C. players
Caracas FC players
Club Deportivo Universidad de San Martín de Porres players
Atlético Universidad footballers
Coronel Bolognesi footballers
Sporting Cristal footballers
José Gálvez FBC footballers
Colegio Nacional Iquitos footballers
1997 Copa América players
Peruvian Primera División players
Peruvian Segunda División players
Super League Greece players
Peruvian expatriate footballers
Expatriate footballers in Greece
Expatriate footballers in Venezuela
Association football forwards
Coronel Bolognesi managers
Cienciano managers